Greg and Karen DeSanto are professional circus clowns who performed as a husband-and-wife duo for three decades. Greg DeSanto is the Executive Director of the International Clown Hall of Fame and Research Center in Baraboo, Wisconsin.

Early life and education 

Greg DeSanto graduated in 1985 from the acclaimed Ringling Brothers and Barnum & Bailey Clown College. He was the featured producing clown and created, wrote, and directed original clown material for Ringling's Blue, Red, and Gold units. His work as a performer has been featured in the center ring of Madison Square Garden, the historic vaudeville stage of the Sarasota Opera House, Lincoln Center, and the White House. He was also a featured performer in the 1996-97 Big Apple Circus tour, Medicine Show. He was inducted into the EHS Hall of Fame in 2001.

Karen graduated from the Ringling Clown College in 1993 and then was featured in Ringling's Blue unit. A member of the Clown Care (SM) hospital clowning program of the Big Apple Circus, Karen is one of the country's leading clown instructors and has developed teaching programs for the Circus's Arts-In-Education program, the National Circus Project and Ocean Park Amusements. As a businesswoman, she created and ran a successful clown and character production company in California. Her performances have taken her to the stages of Carnegie Hall, the State Capital of California, and the Macy's Thanksgiving Day Parade. Karen is also a published author with articles in Rosie magazine and the children's book, Star Saves the Circus.

Professional career 

Together, the DeSantos have served as consultants for Feld Entertainment and have directed the clown material for many editions of Ringling Brothers and Barnum & Bailey. They have been featured comics on cruise lines and in circuses around the world, including a command performances for King Hussein of Morocco. For seven seasons, Greg and Karen were the resident clowns at Circus World Museum in Baraboo, Wisconsin, and appeared together in The Big Apple Circus’ 2005-06 production Grandma Goes To Hollywood.

They separated professionally and were divorced in 2019. Greg continues to serve as Executive Director of the International Clown Hall of Fame and Research Center in Baraboo, Wisconsin. He also consults, directs, writes and appears in a variety of circus and festival performances. He was named a “Circus Legend” by the Association of Circus Fans of America in 2019.

References 

Living people
American clowns
Married couples
Year of birth missing (living people)